San Miguel de Cruces is a town and seat of the municipality of San Dimas, in the state of Durango, north-western Mexico.

Populated places in Durango